Hannah McGowan (born 11 August 1992) is an American retired ice hockey player. McGowan played for the Buffalo Beauts of the National Women's Hockey League (NWHL) during their inaugural 2015–16 season.

Playing career
In college, McGowan played ice hockey for Adrian College from 2011 to 2015 in the Northern Collegiate Hockey Association. In her senior year, McGowan served as captain of the women's ice hockey team.

NWHL
During the inaugural NWHL season of 2015–16, McGowan signed a professional contract with the Buffalo Beauts to play as a forward. McGowan played in all 18 games for the Buffalo Beauts during the season.

Europe
In 2016, McGowan announced her move to play ice hockey in Austria with the Neuburg Highlanders of the Elite Women's Hockey League (EWHL).

References

External links
 

Living people
1992 births
American women's ice hockey forwards
Ice hockey players from Michigan
People from Wayne County, Michigan
Buffalo Beauts players
Adrian Bulldogs women's ice hockey players
American expatriate ice hockey players in Austria
European Women's Hockey League players